Rauddalsvatnet is a lake in Skjåk Municipality in Innlandet county, Norway. The  lake lies just outside the Reinheimen National Park (which surrounds the lake on three sides. The lake sits in a narrow valley with the mountain Skridulaupen to the north and Dyringshøi to the south.

See also
List of lakes in Norway

References

Skjåk
Lakes of Innlandet